Darlan Bispo Damasceno (born 21 July 1994), simply known as Darlan, is a Brazilian footballer who plays as a defensive midfielder for Louletano.

Club career
Born in Irará, Bahia, Darlan was promoted to Vitória's first team in 2014. On 25 July of that year he was loaned to Real Sociedad B for six months, and made his senior debut on 23 August by starting in a 3–3 home draw against UB Conquense in the Segunda División B championship.

On 3 July 2015, after featuring regularly, Darlan was loaned to fellow third-tier club Getafe CF B. He scored his first senior goal on 19 December, netting the first in a 4–0 away routing of UD Socuéllamos, but suffered team relegation at the end of the season.

On 18 January 2017 Darlan moved to Náutico on loan until the end of the year. He made his Série B debut on 13 May, starting in a 0–0 home draw against América Mineiro.

References

External links

1994 births
Living people
Sportspeople from Bahia
Brazilian footballers
Association football midfielders
Campeonato Brasileiro Série B players
Esporte Clube Vitória players
Clube Náutico Capibaribe players
Segunda División B players
Real Sociedad B footballers
Getafe CF B players
Mirassol Futebol Clube players
Veranópolis Esporte Clube Recreativo e Cultural players
Louletano D.C. players
Brazilian expatriate footballers
Brazilian expatriate sportspeople in Spain
Expatriate footballers in Spain
Brazilian expatriate sportspeople in Portugal
Expatriate footballers in Portugal